Maurizio Fontanella (born 29 October 1954) is a former Italian long jumper and triple jumper.

Career
Two-time national champion at senior level in long jump in 1977 and 1979.

Achievements

References

External links
 

1954 births
Living people
Italian male long jumpers
Italian male triple jumpers
Athletics competitors of Fiamme Oro